Mary X. D. O’Riordan is an American molecular biologist who is the Frederick C. Neidhardt Collegiate Professor of Microbiology and Immunology at the University of Michigan. She also serves as Dean for Graduate and Postdoctoral Studies at Michigan Medicine.

Early life and education 
O'Riordan was an undergraduate student at the University of Washington, where she studied biology. She moved to Princeton University for graduate studies, earning a Master's degree in molecular biology. O'Riordan joined the University of California, San Francisco as a doctoral researcher. Her research considered early B cell differentiation. After earning her doctorate, O'Riordan moved to the University of California, Berkeley as a postdoctoral fellow.

Research and career 
In 2003, O'Riordan joined the faculty at the University of Michigan. O'Riordan studies the interactions of bacterial pathogens with their hosts, and innate immune responses to bacterial infection. She is particularly interested in the mechanisms that underpin how the Gram-positive bacterium Listeria monocytogenes interacts with the cellular environment. She is also interested in how the pathogens regulate infection.

O'Riordan discovered the endoplasmic reticulum becomes stressed during lupus, which activates ERN1. ERN1 released neutrophil extracellular traps from lupus neutrophils, which trigger autoantibody formation and contribute to blood vessel clotting.

Academic service 
O'Riordan was inducted into the University of Michigan Medical School League of Educational Excellence in 2013. In 2014, O'Riordan was named a Kavli Foundation fellow. In June 2015, O'Riordan was appointed Dean of Graduate & Postdoctoral Studies at the University of Michigan Medical School. She was named the Frederick C. Neidhardt Collegiate Professor in 2018.

Selected publications

References 

Living people
University of Washington alumni
Princeton University alumni
University of California, San Francisco alumni
University of Michigan faculty
American molecular biologists
American women scientists
20th-century American biologists
21st-century American biologists
Year of birth missing (living people)